Miles Dewey Davis Jr. (March 1, 1898 – May 21, 1962) was an American dentist and father of jazz trumpeter Miles Davis.

Biography
Davis was born on March 1, 1898, in Noble Lake, Arkansas. He was a son of Miles Dewey Davis Sr. and Mary (Luster) Davis. He was educated at the Arkansas State Normal School (now University of Arkansas-Pine Bluff) in Pine Bluff, Arkansas and received his Bachelor of Science degree at Arkansas Baptist College in Little Rock in 1919. His studies continued at Lincoln University in Chester County, Pennsylvania. In 1924, Davis graduated from Northwestern University Dental School in Chicago, Illinois and began his practice the same year. He was a member of the Omega Psi Phi fraternity and the National Medical Association.

On June 16, 1924, he married Cloots Mae (or Cleota) Henry. This union produced three children:

Dorothy Mae Davis (Mrs. Vincent Wilburn), born May 10, 1925 – July 5, 1996
Miles Dewey Davis III, May 26, 1926 – September 28, 1991
Vernon Napoleon Davis, November 3, 1929 – December 15, 1999

Davis moved the family to Alton, Illinois and then to East St. Louis, Illinois, where he served as State Educational Director of the Elks Club. Very active socially and politically, he was also a member of the Masons, Knights of Pythias, American Woodsmen, and the N.A.A.C.P.

At one time, Davis made an unsuccessful bid for a seat on the Illinois State Legislature.

Later years
In 1946, after his first marriage ended, Davis married his second wife, Josephine, who was an assistant principal.  This union produced a son, Joseph, who was born in 1959.

In the late 1940s, Davis purchased a  estate in Millstadt, Illinois.  He began raising imported Landrace hogs, the first African American to do so.  Although he began breeding hogs as a hobby, he would raise over 300 on his estate at a time. He would sell between $14,000 and $21,000 worth of swine at a single auction. His hogs would also win numerous awards at state fairs in Missouri and Illinois.

Tennessee A&I (now Tennessee State University) president Walter S. Davis (no relation) initiated a program to encourage farmers to raise the superior quality Landrace hogs.  He purchased his stock for the program from Miles Davis, who imported his strain from Sir Winston Churchill's farm in England.

In 1962, Davis died in St. Louis of pneumonia following a stroke.

References
Yenser, Thomas (editor), Who's Who in Colored America: A Biographical Dictionary of Notable Living Persons of African Descent in America, Who's Who in Colored America, Brooklyn, New York, 1930-1931-1932 (Third Edition)

1910 (Thirteenth Census of US)Richland (NE of St Louis) dated 4-29-1910

African-American dentists
American dentists
People from East St. Louis, Illinois
People from Jefferson County, Arkansas
University of Arkansas at Pine Bluff alumni
Northwestern University Dental School alumni
1898 births
1962 deaths
Deaths from pneumonia in Missouri
People from Alton, Illinois
People from Millstadt, Illinois
Arkansas Baptist College alumni
20th-century dentists
20th-century African-American people